The Casket of Maria Medici is a 1980 Soviet action film directed by .

Plot 
Antiquary Savigny suddenly disappears without a trace. Investigators conclude that he was killed. The captain of the militia sets off on a journey through time to solve the crime and open the secret of the medieval.

Cast 
 Valeri Ryzhakov
 Klara Luchko
 Emmanuil Vitorgan
 Yevdokiya Urusova
 Anatoliy Egorov
 Ruben Simonov as Kazarian
 Vsevolod Safonov as Colonel Golovin
 Sergey Martynov as Mikhailov
 Daniil Netrebin as Vanashnyi
 Lev Polyakov as Krelin

References

External links 
 

1980 films
1980s Russian-language films
Soviet action films
1980 action films